Jules Chabrol (23 August 1881 – 4 January 1927) was a cricketer. He played in ten first-class matches for British Guiana from 1901 to 1925.

See also
 List of Guyanese representative cricketers

References

External links
 

1881 births
1927 deaths
Cricketers from British Guiana